Solid Gold may refer to:

 The property of being made entirely out of gold, rather than merely having a plating of that metal.

Art and entertainment

Music

Bands and labels
 Solid Gold (band), American indie electronic band
 Solid Gold Cadillac, British jazz-rock group
 Solid Gold Chartbusters, collaboration between Guy Pratt and Jimmy Cauty
 Solid Gold Records, Canadian record label

Albums
 Solid Gold (album), a 1981 album by Gang of Four
 Solid Gold: 30 Golden Hits, compilation album by James Brown
 Solid Gold EP, a 2016 extended play by Canadian singer Nikki Yanofsky
 Chet Atkins's Solid Gold series
 Solid Gold 68, the thirty-fifth studio album
 Solid Gold 69, the thirty-eighth studio album
 Solid Gold 70, the fortieth studio album
 Solid Gold Chipmunks, compilation music album by Alvin and the Chipmunks, released in 1988
 Solid Gold Hits, compilation album by Beastie Boys, released in 2005

Songs
 "Solid Gold" (Dionne Warwick song), a 1980 song by Dionne Warwick
 "Solid Gold" (Keith Moon song), a song written by Nickey Barclay performed by Fanny and covered by Keith Moon
 "Solid Gold" (The Darkness song), a single from the Darkness
 "Solid Gold" (Pnau song), a 2019 single by Pnau
 "Solid Gold", a song by Eagles of Death Metal from their 2006 album Death by Sexy
 "Solid Gold", a song by Nicholas McDonald
 "Solid Gold", a song by Status Quo from their 2002 album Heavy Traffic
 "Solid Gold", a song by Turbowolf
 "Solid Gold", the first song released by electronic duo The Golden Filter

Radio
 Solid Gold (radio), a former New Zealand radio network
Solid Gold Gem, a former United Kingdom radio station

Television
 Solid Gold (TV series), an American syndicated television series that ran from 1980 to 1988

Other uses
 Solid Gold (pet food), an American health food product for pets
 Solid Gold, the name of an American breeding ram selected for imprinting
 Solid Gold series, five Infocom text adventure games updated with in-game hints, among other improvements